Joseph Wallace Oman (1864–1941) was a Rear Admiral in the United States Navy and veteran of the Spanish–American War, the Philippine–American War, and World War I. He is a recipient of the Navy Cross. He was also the Governor of the United States Virgin Islands from 1919 to 1921.

Biography
Oman was born in Lightstreet, Pennsylvania, 15 August 1864, the son of Henry Freas Oman and Mary Jane Shannon. He was brother to Charles Malden Oman.

In 1908 he married at St. Agnes Chapel in New York City, Virginia Center Morse, daughter of William Henry Morse and Sarah Virginia Center, and granddaughter of Alexander Jenkins Center, Vice President of the Panama Railway. Joseph Wallace and Virginia had four children: Virginia (died in infancy); Joseph Wallace Jr, William Morse Oman, and Virginia Morse Oman. He died 1 July 1941 in London, England. He and his wife are buried in Mount Auburn Cemetery, Cambridge, MA.

He entered the United States Naval Academy in 1882, having been appointed a Naval Cadet by congressman Robert Klotz, and graduated 4th in his class of 1886. He was commissioned as an Ensign in 1888 and promoted to Lieutenant, Junior Grade in 1896. During the Philippine–American War, he commanded the gunboat . In 1909, he was promoted to Commander. He was promoted to Captain of the Boston Navy Yard in 1914 and served there until 1914. In 1916-1917 he served as Supervisor, Harbor of New York.

In July 1917, Captain Oman was given command of the former German ship, the SS Vaterland, now claimed by the United States. The Vaterland was in 1914 the largest passenger ship in the world and by the war it was still one of the largest. Two months later, the ship was re-christened as the USS Leviathan and was used as a troop transport. During the war, Captain Oman successfully avoided submarine patrols, despite the vessel's huge size, and managed to deliver nearly 120,000 American troops before the end of the war. For these efforts, Oman was awarded the Navy Cross and promoted to Rear Admiral in 1918.

From 1919 until his retirement from the Navy in 1921, Oman served as the military Governor of the United States Virgin Islands. He is credited as having one of the most efficiently running of the early colonial governments and the island prospered, largely thanks to exports of rum. 
Alton Adams, the first black bandmaster of the U.S. Navy, wrote that his march, The Governor's Own (1921), had been inspired by Oman.

Following his retirement, Oman eventually moved to London, where he died in 1941.

Oman's brother Charles Malden Oman also served in the US Navy, also being a Rear Admiral at the time of Oman's death, and serving as commander of the Naval Medical Center in Washington, D.C.

See also

References

Bibliography
 ADMIRAL J. W. OMAN. Special to THE NEW YORK TIMES. New York Times. New York, N.Y.: Jul 3, 1941. pg. 19, 1 pgs

External links
The Governor's Own (1921), written for Oman by Alton Adams (YouTube)

1864 births
1941 deaths
Governors of the United States Virgin Islands
United States Navy personnel of World War I
Recipients of the Navy Cross (United States)
People from Columbia County, Pennsylvania
United States Navy admirals
Burials at Mount Auburn Cemetery
United States Naval Academy alumni
Military personnel from Pennsylvania